Prodan Stoyanov Gardzhev (8 April 1936 – 5 July 2003) was a Bulgarian middleweight freestyle wrestler. He competed at the 1960, 1964 and 1968 Olympics and won a gold medal in 1964 and a bronze in 1968. Gardzhev held the world title in 1963 and 1966 and placed third in 1965.

References

External links

profile
Obituary

1936 births
2003 deaths
Olympic wrestlers of Bulgaria
Wrestlers at the 1960 Summer Olympics
Wrestlers at the 1964 Summer Olympics
Wrestlers at the 1968 Summer Olympics
Bulgarian male sport wrestlers
Olympic gold medalists for Bulgaria
Olympic bronze medalists for Bulgaria
Olympic medalists in wrestling
Sportspeople from Burgas
Medalists at the 1968 Summer Olympics
Medalists at the 1964 Summer Olympics
European Wrestling Championships medalists
World Wrestling Championships medalists
20th-century Bulgarian people
21st-century Bulgarian people